2-deoxy-scyllo-inosamine dehydrogenase (SAM-dependent) ((gene)) is an enzyme with systematic name 2-deoxy-scyllo-inosamine:S-adenosyl-L-methionine 1-oxidoreductase. This enzyme catalyses the following chemical reaction

 2-deoxy-scyllo-inosamine + S-adenosyl-L-methionine  3-amino-2,3-dideoxy-scyllo-inosose + 5'-deoxyadenosine + L-methionine

This enzyme participates in the biosynthetic pathway of the aminoglycoside antibiotics of the butirosin family.

References

External links 
 

EC 1.1.99